Baby...You're Bummin' My Life out in a Supreme Fashion is the first full-length album for Thelonious Monster. It was released in 1986 and rereleased in Japan in 2002.

Track listing 
 "Psychofuckindelic"
 "Yes Yes No"
 "Positive Train"
 "Let Me in the House"
 "Thelonious Monster"
 "Joke Song"
 "Huck's Jam"
 "Union Street"
 "Try"
 "...and the Rest of the Band"
 "Life's a Groove"
 "Twenty-Four Hours"
 "Happy #12 & #35"

Personnel 
 Bob Forrest — vocals
 Pete Weiss — drums
 John Huck — bass
 K.K. - guitar
 Bill Stobaugh — guitar
 Chris Handsome — guitar
 Dix Denney — guitar

Additional Musicians: Peter Case, James Chance, Russell Conlin, John Dentino, Patrick English, John Eric Greenberg, Tupelo Joe, Alain Johannes, Walt Kibby, Angelo Moore, Scott Morrow, Tree, James White, Norwood Fisher, Jennifer Finch, Julie Bell, Sondra Christianson, Keith Morris, Joe Shea.

Produced by: Brett Gurewitz and Thelonious Monster
Guest Producers: Flea, Anthony Kiedis, Hillel Slovak, Spit Stix, Peter Case, & Norwood Fisher.

References

External links 
 Baby... at Epitaph Records

1986 debut albums
Thelonious Monster albums